As Friends Rust is an American melodic hardcore band based in Gainesville, Florida. Formed in September 1996, the group originally consisted of lead vocalist Damien Moyal, guitarist Henry Olmino, bass guitarist Jeronimo Gomez and drummer Matthew Crum. The original line-up recorded a demo in November 1996, but failing to secure a record deal, the band parted ways in February 1997. In June 1997, Moyal reformed the band with new members, including guitarists Stephen Looker and Gordon Tarpley, drummer Jason Dooley, and bass guitarist Jason Black and As Friends Rust secured a deal with Belgian record label Good Life Recordings. In September 1998, Timothy Kirkpatrick replaced Dooley, and in March 1998, Joseph Simmons replaced Looker and Kaleb Stewart replaced Black. This line-up recorded the band's debut extended play The Fists of Time. Tarpley was replaced by Peter Bartsocas in time for the EP's American promotional concert tour in June–July 1998, but the latter was replaced by James Glayat in October 1998, shortly before the band's first European tour. The line-up remained intact until August 2000, during which time the band released As Friends Rust / Discount, As Friends Rust and Eleven Songs.

Inner tensions caused major line-up changes, culminating with Glayat, Kirkpatrick and, eventually, Stewart quitting in September 2000. Bartsocas, who was visiting Europe at the same time as the band was on tour, filled in for Glayat during August–September 2000, while Stewart filled in on lead vocals while Moyal was sick. After returning home, Moyal and Simmons reconstructed the band by recruiting guitarist and backing vocalist Christopher "Floyd" Beckham, bass guitarist Guillermo Amador, and drummer Alexander Vernon, with whom As Friends Rust recorded the single Morningleaver / This Is Me Hating You. In March 2001, Vernon was replaced by Zachary Swain, and in April 2001, Thomas Rankine replaced Amador. The new line-up recorded As Friends Rust's debut full-length album Won for Doghouse Records / Defiance Records and the extended play A Young Trophy Band in the Parlance of Our Times for Equal Vision Records, and promoted the releases with extensive American, European and British tours (during which the live home video Camden Underworld, London – 16 November 2001 was filmed). By February 2002, tensions had again surfaced, which resulting with Moyal quitting the band at the peak of its popularity. In order to fulfill touring obligations, Beckham switched to lead vocals and Tarpley returned as guitarist, until lead vocalist Adam D'Zurilla was welcomed as Moyal's replacement in late March 2002. With D'Zurilla, As Friends Rust toured the United States, Canada, Europe and the United Kingdom several times, before Beckham quit the band in July 2002. In September 2002, the remaining members of As Friends Rust announced that the band was changing name to Salem.

As Friends Rust reunited in March 2008, with Moyal, Kirkpatrick, Stewart, Simmons and Glayat reprising the 1998–2000 line-up, and the band embarked on a European and British tour in August 2008. For its Japanese tour in June 2014, supporting the compilation album Greatest Hits?, drummer Joshua Williams filled in for Kirkpatrick. Stewart was kicked out of the band in June 2019; he later passed away in March 2021. The band recruited bass guitarist Chad Darby to record the extended play Up From the Muck in 2020. For the band's performance at Furnace Fest in September 2022, Richard Thurston filled in for Kirkpatrick, while Michael Lipscomb performed bass guitar.

Members

Current

Former

Timeline 

 Note that the Studio album and EP bars represent the release dates, not the recording dates; membership often changed between the two events.

Lineups

References 

As Friends Rust